Stellognatha maculata is a species of beetle belonging to the family Cerambycidae.

Description
The basic colour of these impressive long-horned beetles is blackish, with very long antennae and cream patches on the head, the prothorax and the elitra.

Distribution
This species can be found in Madagascar.

References
 Biolib
 Encyclopedia of Life

External links
 Lamiaires du Monde
 CHECKLIST OF THE STERNOTOMINI OF MADAGASCAR AND ADJACENT ISLANDS

Sternotomini
Beetles described in 1835